Leslie Millis (18 June 1881 – 7 April 1950) was an Australian rules footballer who played for the Fitzroy Football Club in the Victorian Football League (VFL). He usually played on the wing or as a rover.

Millis won back-to-back premierships with the club in 1904 and 1905, the latter as Fitzroy's best and fairest. Millis won the award again the following season.

References

External links

1881 births
1950 deaths
Australian rules footballers from Melbourne
Fitzroy Football Club players
Fitzroy Football Club Premiership players
Mitchell Medal winners
Two-time VFL/AFL Premiership players
People from Fitzroy, Victoria